Gull Island is the name of a dozen small islands in the U.S. state of Michigan.

On Lake Huron:
It is a tiny island in Sims Township between Charity Island and Little Charity Island.

On Lake Michigan:
It is within St. James Township and is part of the Michigan Islands National Wildlife Refuge.
It is part of Fairbanks Township. Little Gull Island is an even smaller island about a mile to the south.
In Leelanau County on Northport Bay of the Grand Traverse Bay region. It is a  "No Trespassing Nature Preserve" owned by the Leelanau Conservancy which is dedicated to protecting this southernmost herring gull colony nesting area on Lake Michigan.

On Lake Superior:
They are northeast of Passage Island in Isle Royale National Park, and lie nearly on top of the International Boundary.

On Lake St. Clair:
It is at the mouth of the south channel of the St. Clair River. Currently the site of the annual Jobbie Nooner party in Michigan.

On St. Marys River system:
It is northwest of Drummond Island and is part of Drummond Township.

On inland lakes:
On Manistique Lake in Portage Township, Mackinac County at

References

Islands of Michigan